Cashmore may refer to:

People
Adrian Cashmore (born 1973), New Zealand rugby player
Anthony Cashmore (born 1941), New Zealand scientist
Arthur Cashmore (1893–1969), English footballer
Bill Cashmore (politician), New Zealand politician
Bill Cashmore (actor) (1961–2017), English actor, playwright, and political candidate
Claire Cashmore (born 1988), British Paralympian swimmer
Denis William Cashmore (1907–1982), English footballer
Jennifer Cashmore (born 1937), Australian politician
John Cashmore (1895–1961), American politician
Michael Cashmore (businessman) (1815–1886), Australian pioneer
Michael Cashmore, British composer
Pete Cashmore (born 1985), British new media expert
Roger Cashmore (born 1944), British physicist
Thomas Cashmore (1892–1984), British bishop

Places
Cashmore, Victoria, Australia

Business
John Cashmore Ltd, former scrapping company of Newport, South Wales

See also
Cashmere (disambiguation)